Sonia & Selena, also known as Sonia y Selena, was a Spanish Latin pop duo formed by Sonia Madoc and Selena Leo in 2000. They gained success with their first album Yo quiero bailar (. The group dissolved in 2002.

History 

Sonia & Selena formed in 2000 with members Sonia Madoc (born on October 23, 1974) and Selena Leo (born on August 23, 1975). They first gained notoriety for participating in the Spanish national final for the Eurovision Song Contest 2001, but eventually they were not chosen as the Spanish entry. Despite the group not being selected, their debut album Yo quiero bailar was a big success. It achieved gold and platinum certification in places such as Spain, Latin America and Europe and sold over 1,000,000 copies there.

Dissolution 
By the end of the year, the group had won numerous awards and achieved commercial success. Despite their huge success there were rumors of disbanding. Those rumors were later confirmed by both of the artists. The reason of disbanding were the numerous fights between members Sonia and Selena. Finally they officially disbanded in the spring of 2002.

Careers as solo artists 
After the disbanding of the group, Selena pursued a solo career making two albums with sales of 100,000 copies. In 2005, she participated in the second season of reality TV show The Farm but she only stayed in the game for two weeks.

Sonia returned in 2007 after six years of musical absence, announcing a new pop and dance album in the same musical style as "Sonia & Selena" tracks. During the summer of 2008, she eventually released her record but only digitally.

The attempts of both singers in pursuing a solo career were not as successful as the results with their 2001 hit album Yo Quiero Bailar, neither in the part of sales nor in the part of fans.

Discography

Album
 Yo quiero bailar (2001)

References 

[ Sonia & Selena] at Allmusic

External links
Sonia & Selena entry at artistwiki.com
Sonia & Selena singing "Yo quiero bailar" live at La1 of TVE

Spanish pop music groups